Węgierce  is a village in the administrative district of Gmina Tarnówka, within Złotów County, Greater Poland Voivodeship, in west-central Poland.

Before 1772 the area was part of Kingdom of Poland, 1772-1945 Prussia and Germany. For more on its history, see Złotów County.

The village has a population of 120.

References

Villages in Złotów County